Giovanni Bramucci (15 November 1946 – 26 September 2019) was an Italian road cyclist. In 1968 he won bronze medals in the team time trial at the 1968 Summer Olympics in Mexico City and UCI Road World Championships. Individually he finished eighth at the Olympics and tenth at the world championships. After that he turned professional, but had little success and retired in 1971.

References

1946 births
2019 deaths
People from Civitavecchia
Italian male cyclists
Cyclists at the 1968 Summer Olympics
Olympic cyclists of Italy
Olympic bronze medalists for Italy
Olympic medalists in cycling
Cyclists from Lazio
Medalists at the 1968 Summer Olympics
Sportspeople from the Metropolitan City of Rome Capital